LightSail Energy (2008-2018) was a Berkeley, California compressed air energy storage technology startup, working on energy storage devices based on compressed-air energy storage infused with water vapour in order to retain calorimetric energy and increase energy efficiency up to marketable levels. The parallel emergence of cheaper energy storage devices such as the Lithium-ion batteries have been cited as the cause for LightSail's failure to commercialize its storage devices.

Technology 
LightSail was working on energy storage products based on compressed-air energy storage infused with water vapour in order to retain calorimetric energy and increase energy efficiency up to marketable levels. Classic compression process creates heat, and doing so lose energy. LightSail used water vapor to recapture this heat energy, and convert it back into electricity, therefore increasing the energy efficiency of the storage device. Its first aim was to power an urban scooter, but the company goal soon shifted towards a compressed-air storage/powered generator fitting inside a standard shipping container. In December 2015, Fong announced that pilot tests for the system were scheduled to begin in 2016. By that time LightSail had started working on developing pressurized gas storage tanks for the natural gas industry. Research and development were discontinued due to emergence of financially cheaper alternatives.

Business development 
Investors in LightSail include Khosla Ventures, Peter Thiel, Microsoft founder Bill Gates, Innovacorp, and oil supermajor Total S.A. In 2012, LightSail D-round founding rose 37.5 millions US$.  It reached 55 employees in late 2014. By February 2016, LightSail had raised about $70 million in venture capital investment. The company said it sold their first compressed air-vapor energy storage in 2016.

In December 2017, the company ran out of money. In December 2017, it cut the workforce down to 15 as it entered "hibernation". In March 2018, the company closed. Innovacorp vice-president of investment Charles Baxter cited the emergence of cheaper Lithium-ion batteries in the field of energy storage as the reason for LightSail's failure to commercialize its storage devices.

Nova Scotia project
Plans for a test site in Nova Scotia were announced in July 2014.  Surplus energy from wind turbines was to be stored using a compressed-air system with a water-based heat recovery process. This project did not come to fruition.

References

External links
 LightSail website 

Privately held companies of the United States
2008 establishments in California